Saint Albert or St. Albert (earlier forms Adelbert, Adalbert, Adalbero, Adalbéron) may refer to:

People
Saint Æthelberht of Kent (died 616), Anglo-Saxon king of Kent, first English king to embrace Christianity
Saint Adalbert of Egmond (died 740), English missionary and possibly abbot – also known as Adelbert of Egmond
Saint Albert of Cashel (died 800), English laborer in Ireland and Bavaria

Saint Adalbert (Archbishop of Magdeburg) (c. 910–981), possibly Alsatian monk, missionary, abbot and Archbishop of Magdeburg – also known as Albert of Magdeburg and Apostle of the Slavs
Saint Adalbéron I de Verdun (d. 1005), French monk, Bishop of Verdun and Bishop of Metz; founder of Cluniac monasteries – also known as Adalbero
Saint Adalbert of Prague (c.956–997), Bohemian Bishop of Prague, hermit, missionary and martyr – also known as Albert of Prague
Blessed Adalbero of Würzburg (c. 1010–1090), Austrian Bishop of Würzburg and Count of Lambach-Wels; joint founder of Zwiefalten Abbey

Saint Albert of Montecorvino (d. 1127), Norman Bishop of Montecorvino
Saint Albert of Chiatina (1135–1202), Italian archpriest – also known as Alberto di Colle
Blessed Albert Avogadro (1149–1214), Italian canon lawyer, Bishop of Bobbio, Bishop of Vercelli and Latin Patriarch of Jerusalem; author of the Carmelite Rule of St. Albert – also known as Saint Albert of Jerusalem
Saint Albert of Louvain (1166–1192), Brabantine Prince-Bishop of Liège – also known as Albert of Leuven
Saint Albert of Genoa (died 1239), Italian lay brother and hermit – also known as Lambert of Genoa
Saint Albertus Magnus (c. 1193–1280), German friar, bishop and Doctor of the Church – also known as Albert the Great and Albert of Cologne
Saint Albert of Trapani (c. 1240–1307), Sicilian priest – also known as Albert of Sicily and Alberto degli Abbati
Saint Albert Chmielowski (1845–1916), Polish founder of the Albertine Brothers – also known as Adam Chmielowski, Brat Albert (Brother Albert), Brother of Our Lord, Brother of Our God, and Our God's Brother

Places
St. Albert, Alberta
St. Albert (federal electoral district)
St. Albert (provincial electoral district)
St. Albert Trail
St. Albert, Ontario

See also
 St. Aloysius on the Ohio, also known as "St. Al's"